Our Brand Is Crisis may refer to:

Our Brand Is Crisis (2005 film), American political documentary
Our Brand Is Crisis (2015 film), American comedy-drama based on the 2005 film